Saint-Urbain-Premier is a municipality located southwest of Montreal in Beauharnois-Salaberry, in the Montérégie region of Quebec, Canada. The population as of the Canada 2016 Census was 1,264. The municipality is named for Pope Urban I, who reigned from 222 to 230AD.

Demographics

Population

Language

See also
 Beauharnois-Salaberry Regional County Municipality
 Chateauguay River
 List of municipalities in Quebec

References

External links
 

Municipalities in Quebec
Incorporated places in Beauharnois-Salaberry Regional County Municipality